The 1941 UCLA Bruins football team was an American football team that represented the University of California, Los Angeles (UCLA) in Pacific Coast Conference (PCC) during the 1941 college football season. In their third season under head coach Edwin C. Horrell, the Bruins compiled a 5–5–1 record (3–4–1 against PCC opponents), finished fifth in the PCC, and were outscored by a total of 178 to 128.

Quarterback Bob Waterfield later played for the Los Angeles Rams and was inducted into the Pro Football Hall of Fame. Other key players included Clarence Mackey, a transfer player from Compton Junior College.

Schedule

Game summaries

USC

Bob Waterfield lateraled to Vic Smith for a 12-yard touchdown in the third quarter to put the Bruins on the scoreboard first. Bobby Robertson scored from the 1-yard line for USC.

1941 NFL Draft
The following players were claimed in the 1941 NFL Draft.

References

UCLA
UCLA Bruins football seasons
UCLA Bruins football
UCLA Bruins football